Someday/Somehow is the debut solo album from Steve Porcaro.

History
Steve Porcaro worked on the album for many years with collaborator Michael Sherwood. Several members of Porcaro's band Toto guest on the album, including his two brothers Mike and Jeff Porcaro, who had died before the album was released, and Steve Lukather, Lenny Castro, Shannon Forrest and Mabvuto Carpenter.

Two songs planned for the album were used instead on Toto's Toto XIV: "The Little Things" and, as a Japan-only bonus track, "Bend". "Back to You" was worked on by Toto in 1983 and finished in 2015.

Track listing
"Ready or Not" (Porcaro, Michael Sherwood, Jamie Kimmett) – 5:18
"Loved by a Fool" (Porcaro, Sherwood) – 4:20
"Someday/Somehow" (Porcaro, Sherwood) – 4:33
"Swing Street" (Porcaro, Sherwood) – 4:48
"She's So Shy" (Porcaro, Sherwood, Kimmett) – 3:49
"Back to You" (Porcaro) – 4:02
"Face of a Girl" (Porcaro, Sherwood, Kimmett) – 4:30
"To No One" (Porcaro, Sherwood) – 4:28
"Make Up" (Porcaro, Sherwood) – 4:20
"She's the One" (Porcaro, Sherwood) – 3:21
"Night of Our Own" (Porcaro, Sherwood, Kimmett) – 3:35
"Painting by Numbers" (Porcaro, Sherwood, Julius Robinson) – 4:32
"More Than I Can Take" (Porcaro) – 4:04

Personnel

Musicians
 Steve Porcaro – keyboards (all tracks), lead vocals (1, 2, 3, 6, 8, 10, 13), backing vocals (3, 4, 5, 7, 8, 9, 11, 12), acoustic piano (13)
 John Van Tongeren – synthesizers (11)
 Marc Bonilla – guitars (1, 5, 7)
 Jimmy Haun – guitars (3, 4, 8, 9), acoustic guitar (11)
 Steve Lukather – guitars (4, 10, 11, 12)
 Mike Porcaro – bass guitar (1, 4-7, 9)
 Sam Porcaro – bass guitar (3)
 Shannon Forrest – drums (1, 5, 10)
 Robin Dimaggio – drums (2, 7, 12), percussion (3, 9, 12)
 Toss Panos – drums (4)
 Jeff Porcaro – drums (6)
 Rick Marotta – drums (11)
 Lenny Castro – percussion (1-5, 7, 10, 11, 12)
 Mike Biardi – loops (5, 7)
 Don Markese – clarinet (3), tin whistle (6), flute (9, 10)
 Chuck Manning – saxophones
 Scott Whitfield – trombone 
 Carl Saunders – trumpet, trumpet solo (4)
 Timothy Loo – cello 
 Darrin McCann – viola 
 Marisa Kuney – violin 
 Songa Lee – violin 
 Michael Sherwood – backing vocals (1-10, 12), lead vocals (9)
 Michael McDonald – lead vocals (4, 11)
 Jamie Kimmett – lead vocals (5, 7), backing vocals (5, 7, 11, 12)
 Mabvuto Carpenter – lead vocals (12)

Production
 Steve Porcaro – producer 
 Michael Sherwood – co-producer 
 Mike Ging – engineer 
 Ryan Johnson – engineer 
 Forrest Riege – engineer 
 David Davis – recording 
 Marc Bonilla – recording (1, 5, 7)
 Shannon Forrest – recording (1, 5, 10)
 Ed Cherney – recording (2)
 Oscar "Ozzy" Doniz – recording (4)
 Greg Ladanyi – recording (6)
 Julian Chan – recording (7)
 John Paterno – mixing, mastering 
 Heather Porcaro – design, photography

References

2016 debut albums